Waukegan Township is a township in Lake County, Illinois, USA.  As of the 2010 census, its population was 90,893.

Geography
Lakes in this township include Dead Lake. Sunderland Creek and the Waukegan River run through this township.

Cities and towns
 Beach Park (north quarter)
 North Chicago (south quarter)
 Park City (west quarter)
 Waukegan (partial)

Adjacent townships
 Benton Township (north)
 Shields Township (south)
 Libertyville Township (southwest)
 Warren Township (west)
 Newport Township (northwest)

Cemeteries
The township contains five cemeteries: Am Echod Jewish, North Shore Garden of Memories, Oakwood, Pahlman Family and Saint Marys.

Major highways
 U.S. Route 41
 Illinois Route 120
 Illinois Route 131
 Illinois Route 132
 Illinois Route 137

Airports and landing strips
 Waukegan Regional Airport
 Saint Therese Medical Center Heliport
 Victory Memorial Hospital Off Heliport

Demographics

References
 U.S. Board on Geographic Names (GNIS)
 United States Census Bureau cartographic boundary files

External links
 Waukegan Township official website
 US-Counties.com
 City-Data.com
 US Census
 Illinois State Archives

Townships in Lake County, Illinois
Townships in Illinois